The Belgium women's national 3x3 team is a national basketball team of Belgium, administered by the Royal Belgian Basketball Federation. It represents the country in international 3x3 (3 against 3) women's basketball competitions.

World Cup record

See also
Belgium men's national 3x3 team
Belgium women's national basketball team

References

External links

Women's national 3x3 basketball teams
Basketball